Go Jin-won (born 26 October 1956) is a South Korean wrestler. He competed in the men's freestyle 68 kg at the 1976 Summer Olympics.

References

External links 
 

1956 births
Living people
South Korean male sport wrestlers
Olympic wrestlers of South Korea
Wrestlers at the 1976 Summer Olympics
Place of birth missing (living people)
Asian Games silver medalists for South Korea
Asian Games bronze medalists for South Korea
Asian Games medalists in wrestling
Wrestlers at the 1974 Asian Games
Wrestlers at the 1978 Asian Games
Wrestlers at the 1982 Asian Games
Medalists at the 1978 Asian Games
Medalists at the 1982 Asian Games
20th-century South Korean people
21st-century South Korean people